Reculver is a village and coastal resort about  east of Herne Bay on the north coast of Kent in south-east England.
It is in the ward of the same name, in the City of Canterbury district of Kent. 

Reculver once occupied a strategic location at the north-western end of the Wantsum Channel, a sea lane that separated the Isle of Thanet and the Kent mainland until the late Middle Ages. This led the Romans to build a small fort there at the time of their conquest of Britain in 43 AD, and, starting late in the 2nd century, they built a larger fort, or castrum, called Regulbium, which later became one of the chain of Saxon Shore forts. Following the withdrawal of the Western Roman Empire in ca. early C4th, the Brythons again took control of the lands until Anglo-Saxon invasions shortly afterward.

By the 7th century Reculver had become a landed estate of the Anglo-Saxon kings of Kent. The site of the Roman fort was given over for the establishment of a monastery dedicated to St Mary in 669 AD, and King Eadberht II of Kent was buried there in the 760s. During the Middle Ages Reculver was a thriving township with a weekly market and a yearly fair, and it was a member of the Cinque Port of Sandwich. The settlement declined as the Wantsum Channel silted up, and coastal erosion claimed many buildings constructed on the soft sandy cliffs. The village was largely abandoned in the late 18th century, and most of the church was demolished in the early 19th century. Protecting the ruins and the rest of Reculver from erosion is an ongoing challenge.

The 20th century saw a revival as local tourism developed and there are now two caravan parks. The census of 2001 recorded 135 people in the Reculver area, nearly a quarter of whom were in caravans at the time. The Reculver coastline is within a Site of Special Scientific Interest, a Special Protection Area and a Ramsar site, including most of Reculver Country Park, which itself includes much of Bishopstone Cliffs local nature reserve. While nationally scarce plants and insects are found there, the location is also important for migrating birds and is of significant geological interest.

History

Toponymy
The earliest recorded form of the name, Regulbium, is in Latin and dates from the early 5th century or before, but it had its origin in a Common Brittonic word meaning "at the promontory" or "great headland". In Old English this became corrupted to Raculf, sometimes given as Raculfceastre, giving rise to the modern "Reculver". The form "Raculfceastre" includes the Old English place-name element "ceaster", which frequently relates to "a [Roman] city or walled town".

Prehistoric and Roman

Stone Age flint tools have been washed out from the cliffs to the west of Reculver, and a Mesolithic tranchet axe was found near the centre of the Roman fort in 1960. This was probably an accidental loss, rather than suggesting a human settlement, evidence for which begins with late Bronze Age and Iron Age ditches. These indicate an extensive settlement, where a Bronze Age palstave and Iron Age gold coins have been found. A full-size fort, or castrum, was started late in the 2nd century. This date is derived in part from a reconstruction of a uniquely detailed plaque, fragments of which were found by archaeologists in the 1960s. The plaque effectively records the establishment of the fort, since it commemorates the construction of two of its principal features, the basilica and the sacellum, or shrine, both being parts of the headquarters building, or principia:

These structures were found by archaeologists, together with probable officers' quarters, barracks and a bath house.

The fort was located on a low hill, beyond which a long promontory then projected north-eastwards into the sea and formed the north-eastern extremity of mainland Kent: thus it offered observation on all sides, including both the Thames Estuary and the sea lane later known as the Wantsum Channel, which lay between it and the Isle of Thanet. It was probably built by soldiers of the Cohors I Baetasiorum, originally from Lower Germany, who had previously served at the Roman fort of Alauna at Maryport in Cumbria at least until the early 180s, since tiles recovered from the fort are stamped "CIB". The Notitia Dignitatum, a Roman administrative document from the early 5th century, also records the presence of the Cohors I Baetasiorum at Reculver, then known as Regulbium. There must also have been a harbour nearby in Roman times, and, though this has not yet been found, it was probably near to the fort's southern or eastern side.

The entrance to the fort's headquarters building faced north, indicating that the main gate was on the north side, facing the eponymous promontory and the sea. The north wall has been lost to the sea, along with the adjoining part of the east wall and most of the west wall; the east wall is most complete and includes the remains of the eastern gateway and guard post. Parts of the surviving walls are all that remains of the fort above ground, and all have suffered from stone-robbing, especially near the south-western corner.

Roman forts were normally accompanied by a civilian settlement, or vicus: at Reculver this lay outside the north and west sides of the fort, much of it in areas now lost to the sea, and was extensive, perhaps covering "some ten hectares [25 acres] in all." In 1936 R.F. Jessup noted that "a Roman building with a hypocaust and tesselated [floor once] stood considerably to the northward of the fort": this structure had been observed by the  18th-century antiquarian John Battely, and was probably "an external bath  relating to [an early phase of] the fort." In the same area Battely described "several cisterns" between 10 and 12 feet (3–3.7 m) square, lined with oak planks and sealed at the bottom with puddled clay. He believed that these were for storing rainwater, and noted that a Roman strigil, which would have been used in a bath house, had been found in a similar cistern at Reculver; he also observed that "such a multitude [of cisterns] has been discovered, almost in our memory, as proves that the ancient inhabitants of the place were very numerous." In the 20th century twelve wells of the Roman period were identified to the west of the fort, ten of which were square; all were cut into the hard layer of sandstone below the soft sandstone of the Thanet Beds, thus tapping into the water table.

At least 10 infant burials have been found within the fort, all of babies, of which six were associated with Roman buildings: five sets of infant remains were found within the foundations and walls of buildings, as were coins dating from 270 to 300 AD. It was suspected that more such burials might be found in the walls of a building in the south-western area of the fort if it were excavated further. A baby's feeding bottle was also found in an excavated floor within  of one of the infant skeletons, though it may have been unconnected with the burials. The babies were probably buried in the buildings as ritual sacrifices, but it is unknown whether they were selected for burial because they were already dead, perhaps stillborn, or if they were buried alive or killed for the purpose. A local tale subsequently developed that the grounds of the fort were haunted by the sound of a crying baby.

Towards the end of the 3rd century a Roman naval commander named Carausius, who later declared himself emperor in Britain, was given the task of clearing pirates from the sea between Britain and the European mainland. In so doing he established a new chain of command, the British part of which was later to pass under the control of a Count of the Saxon Shore. The Notitia Dignitatum shows that the fort at Reculver became part of this arrangement, and its location meant that it lay at the "main point of contact in the system [of Saxon Shore forts]". Archaeological evidence indicates that it was abandoned in the 370s.

Medieval

By the 7th century Reculver was part of a landed estate of the Anglo-Saxon kings of Kent, possibly with a royal toll-station or a "significant coastal trading settlement," given the types and large quantity of coins found there. Other early Anglo-Saxon finds include a fragment of a gilt bronze brooch, or fibula, which was originally circular and set with coloured stones or glass, a claw beaker and pottery. Antiquarians such as the 18th-century clergyman John Duncombe believed that King Æthelberht of Kent moved his royal court there from Canterbury in about 597, and built a palace on the site of the Roman ruins. However, archaeological excavation has shown no evidence of this; Æthelberht's household would have been peripatetic, and the story has been described as probably a "pious legend". A church was built on the site of the Roman fort in about 669, when King Ecgberht of Kent granted land for the foundation of a monastery, which was dedicated to St Mary.

The monastery developed as the centre of a "large estate, a manor and a parish", and, by the early 9th century, it had become "extremely wealthy", but it then fell under the control of the archbishops of Canterbury. In 811 Archbishop Wulfred is recorded as having deprived the monastery of some of its land, and soon after it featured in a "monumental showdown" between Wulfred and King Coenwulf of Mercia over the control of monasteries. In 838 control of all monasteries under Canterbury's authority was passed to the kings of Wessex, by the agreement of Archbishop Ceolnoth in exchange for protection from Viking attacks.

By 1066 the monastery had become a parish church. However, in 1086 Reculver was named in Domesday Book as a hundred, and the manor was valued at £42.7s. (£42.35). Included in the Domesday account for the manor, as well as the church, farmland, a mill, salt pans and a fishery, are 90 villeins and 25 bordars: these numbers can be multiplied four or five times to account for dependents, as they only represent "adult male heads of households". At that time, although Domesday Book records that Reculver belonged to the archbishop of Canterbury in both 1066 and 1086, in reality it must again have been lost to him, since William the Conqueror is recorded as having returned it, among other churches and properties, to the archbishop at his death. In the 13th century Reculver was a parish of "exceptional wealth", and the considerable enlargement of the church building during the Middle Ages indicates that the settlement had become a "thriving township", with "dozens of houses". In 1310 Archbishop Robert Winchelsey of Canterbury noted that the population of the whole parish in the time of his predecessor John Peckham (c. 1230–1292) had numbered more than 3,000. For this reason, and because the parish was also large geographically, he converted chapelries at Herne and, on the Isle of Thanet, St Nicholas-at-Wade and Shuart into parishes, though the church at Hoath remained a perpetual curacy belonging to Reculver parish until 1960. Records for the poll tax of 1377 show that there were then 364 individuals of 14 years and above, not including "honest beggars", in the reduced parish of Reculver, who paid a total of £6.1s.4d. (£6.07) towards the tax.

Decline and loss to the sea

The thriving medieval township depended partly on its position on a maritime trade route through the Wantsum Channel, already present in Anglo-Saxon times and exemplified by Reculver's membership of the Cinque Port of Sandwich later in the Middle Ages. The importance of the Wantsum Channel was such that, when the River Thames froze in 1269, trade between Sandwich and London had to be carried out overland. Historical records for the channel are sparse after 1269, perhaps "because the route was so well known as to be taken for granted [in the Middle Ages], the whole waterway from London to Sandwich being occasionally spoken of as the 'Thames'". But silting and inning had closed the channel to trading vessels sailing along it by about 1460 or soon after, and the first bridge was built over it at Sarre in 1485, since ferries could no longer operate reliably across it.

Reculver was also diminished by coastal erosion. By 1540, when John Leland recorded a visit there, the coastline to the north had receded to within little more than a quarter of a mile (400 m) of the "Towne [which] at this tyme [was] but Village lyke". Soon afterwards, in 1576, William Lambarde described Reculver as "poore and simple". In January 1658 the local justices of the peace were petitioned concerning "encroachments of the sea ... [which had] since Michaelmas last [29 September 1657] encroached on the land near six rods ], and will doubtless do more harm".

Concern about erosion of the cliff on which the church stood, and the possible inundation of the village, had led the commissioners of sewers to install costly sea defences consisting of planking and piling before 1783, when it was reported that the commissioners had adopted a scheme proposed by Sir Thomas Page to protect the church: the sea defences had proven counter-productive, since sea water collected behind them and continued to undermine the cliff. Before this, according to John Duncombe, "the commissioners of sewers, and the occupiers who pay scots, [had] no view nor interest but to secure the level [ground], which must be overflowed when the hill is washed away." By 1787 Reculver had "dwindled into an insignificant village, thinly decked with the cottages of fishermen and smugglers."

In September 1804 a high tide and strong winds led to the destruction of five houses, one of which was "an ancient building, immediately opposite the public house, and had the appearance of having been part of some monastic erection". The following year, according to a set of notes written by the parish clerk John Brett, "Reculver Church and willage stood in safety", but in 1806 the sea began to encroach on the village, and in 1807 the local farmers dismantled the sea defences, after which "the village became a total [wreck] to the mercy of the sea."

A further scheme to protect the cliff and church was proposed by John Rennie, but a decision was taken on 12 January 1808 to demolish the church. By March 1809, erosion of the cliff had brought it to within  of the church, and demolition was begun in September that year. Trinity House intervened to ensure that the towers were preserved as a navigational aid, and in 1810 it bought what was left of the structure for £100 and built the first groynes, designed to protect the cliff on which the ruined church stands. The vicarage was abandoned at the same time as the church, or a little later, and a replacement parish church was built at Hillborough, opening in 1813.

After the sea undermined the foundations of the Hoy and Anchor Inn at Reculver in January 1808, the building was taken down and the redundant vicarage was used as a temporary replacement under the same name. Although it was reported in 1800 that there were then only five or six houses left in the village, a new Hoy and Anchor Inn was built by 1809, and this was renamed as the King Ethelbert Inn by 1838. Further construction work is indicated by a stone over the doorway to the inn bearing a date of 1843, and it was later extended into the form in which it stands today, "probably ... in 1883".

Today the site of the church, including the upper part of the sea defences there, is managed by English Heritage, and the village has all but disappeared. The present appearance of the cliff below the church, a grassy slope above a large stone apron, was the work of central government and was in place by April 1867. In 2000 the surviving fragments of an early medieval cross that once stood inside the old church were used to design a Millennium Cross to commemorate two thousand years of Christianity. This stands at the entrance to the car park and was commissioned by Canterbury City Council.

Bouncing bombs

During the Second World War, the coastline east of the village was used to test prototypes of Barnes Wallis's bouncing bomb. This area was chosen for its seclusion, while the clear landmark of the church towers and the ease of recovering prototypes from the shallow water were probably also factors. Different, inert versions of the bomb were tested at Reculver, leading to the development of the operational version known as "Upkeep". This bomb was used by the RAF's 617 Squadron in Operation Chastise, otherwise known as the Dambuster raids, in which dams in the Ruhr district of Germany were attacked on the night of 16–17 May 1943 by formations of Lancaster bombers. On 17 May 2003 a Lancaster bomber overflew the Reculver testing site to commemorate the 60th anniversary of the exploit.

Others are on display in Dover Castle and in the Spitfire & Hurricane Memorial Museum at the former RAF Manston, on the Isle of Thanet. Part of an inert Upkeep bomb, consisting mostly of a circular end with some of its filling still adhering, was uncovered during beach maintenance work undertaken at Reculver by the Environment Agency on 29 March 2017.

Governance

In the 10th-century charter by which King Eadred gave Reculver to the archbishops of Canterbury, the boundary of the mainland part of the estate was about the same as those for the adjoining parishes of Reculver, Hoath and Herne in the 20th century, and the estate included part of the Isle of Thanet. In 1086, Domesday Book named Reculver as a hundred, meaning that it was probably the meeting-place for the local hundred court. The hundred included Hoath and Herne, and it may also have included the neighbouring area of Thanet. In 1274–75 the local hundred was much larger: it was then named after Bleangate, in a detached part of Chislet parish, and was divided into northern and southern halves; it also included part of Thanet. By 1540 Bleangate hundred no longer included land on Thanet, its members being listed then as Sturry, Chislet, Reculver and Herne for the archaic taxes known as "fifteenths and tenths", and in 1659 they were listed as Chislet, Herne, Hoath, Reculver, Stourmouth, Sturry and Westbere. In 1808 the members of the northern half-hundred, or "Bleangate Upper", were listed as Herne, Reculver, Stourmouth and Hoath. The constable for the northern half-hundred was chosen at the court leet of the manor of Reculver, which by 1800 was usually held at Herne.

The parish was represented by two tithings – known in Kent as "borghs" – in the Hundred Rolls of 1274–75 and, 400 years later, for the purposes of the Hearth Tax, levied between 1662 and 1689. In 1274–75 they appear as Reculver borgh and Brookgate borgh; in 1663 they appear as Reculver Street borgh and Brookgate borgh, which were recorded under a parish heading for Reculver, together with Hoath borgh; and in 1673 Reculver borgh and Brookgate borgh were recorded under a heading for Herne parish, while Hoath was recorded under its own parish heading. However, borghs in Kent, and tithings generally, were related to the manorial and hundredal administration of a county, rather than to the ecclesiastical parishes in which they lay.

The parishes of Herne and, on the Isle of Thanet, St Nicholas-at-Wade were created from parts of Reculver parish in 1310, although they  continued to have a subordinate relationship with their original parish into the 19th century, while Hoath remained a perpetual curacy into the 20th. The parish extended west almost to Beltinge, in Herne parish, and to Broomfield in the south-west, where the boundary with Herne parish ran along the centre of the main thoroughfare, now Margate Road; it was bounded in open country on the south-east and east by the parish of Chislet. In 1934 the civil functions of the parish were transferred to the civil parish of Herne Bay.

Reculver is in an electoral ward of the same name that includes Beltinge, Bishopstone, Brook Farm, Boyden Gate, Chislet, Hillborough, Hoath and Maypole. The ward is in the local government district of Canterbury and has one seat on Canterbury City Council; in the local elections of 2019, the seat was won by Rachel Lois Carnac, Conservative. At the national level Reculver is in the English parliamentary constituency of North Thanet, for which Roger Gale (Conservative) has been MP since 1983.

Geography

Sediments laid down around 55 million years ago are particularly well displayed in the cliffs to the west. Nearby Herne Bay is the type section for the upper part of the Thanet Formation, previously known as the Thanet Beds, consisting of a fine-grained sand that can be clayey and glauconitic and is of Thanetian (late Paleocene) age. It rests unconformably on the Chalk Group, and forms the base of the cliffs in the Reculver and Herne Bay area. Above the Thanet Sand are the Upnor Formation, a medium sandstone, and the sandy clays of the Harwich Formation at the Paleocene–Eocene boundary. The surface consists mainly of flint gravel with some areas of brickearth, both of which are glacial deposits.

Rocks such as these are easily washed away by the sea. Coastal erosion had washed away most of Reculver village by 1800, leading residents to re-locate to Hillborough, within Reculver parish. A plan is in place to manage this erosion whereby some parts of the coastline such as the country park will be allowed to continue eroding, and others – including the site of the Roman fort and the medieval church – will be protected from further erosion. New sea defences were built in the 1990s, including covering the beaches around the church with boulders.

Average maximum and minimum temperatures are about 0.5 °C (0.3 °F) higher than they are nationally. Locations on the north coast of Kent, like Reculver, are sometimes warmer than areas further inland, owing to the influence of the North Downs to the south. Occasional drought conditions can lead to the imposition of Temporary Use Bans to conserve water supplies, and it was announced in 2013 that a water desalination plant was to be built at Reculver to increase supplies.

Demography
But this included holidaymakers, and in 2005 the number of people at Reculver was estimated to increase to "over 1,000 at the height of the [summer] holiday season".

In the 2001 census, conducted on 29 April, the relevant census area covered  and included only Reculver and outlying farms and houses, in which 135 people were found, almost a quarter of whom were in caravans. All were born in the United Kingdom except for three individuals from the Republic of Ireland and three from South Africa. Gender was given as 69 female and 66 male, and the age distribution was 12 individuals aged 0–5 years (8.8%), 16 aged 6–16 years (14%), 30 aged 17–35 years (22.2%), 14 aged 36–45 years (10.3%), 44 aged 46–64 years (32.5%) and 21 aged 65 years and over (15.5%). Half (67) of all the individuals recorded were described as economically active, with 58 of these having employers and nine being self-employed; none were recorded as full-time students or unemployed. Twenty-four people (17.7%) were described as retired. Of those aged 16–74 years, 14 (12.8%) were placed at the highest level for education or qualification. Christianity was the only religion represented, by 99 individuals, with 22 recorded as having no religion and 14 whose religion was not stated. From April 2001 to March 2002 the average gross weekly income of households in the electoral ward of Reculver was estimated by the Office for National Statistics as £560, or £29,120 per year; this was below the average for the south-east of England, excluding London, which was £660, or £34,320.

Therefore, while the total resident population of the ward at the 2011 census numbered 8,845, detailed information comparable to that of the 2001 census is unavailable.

Economy

In the Middle Ages Reculver was one of several members, or "limbs", of the Cinque Port of Sandwich: possibly originating in a loose association in the 11th century, this status was first recorded in about 1300. Like other limbs at Fordwich, Deal, Sarre and Stonar, it was then involved in maritime trade, and it shared in the Cinque Ports' duty to supply ships and men for the king's use, in return for concessions such as tax exemption. The last surviving record of Reculver as a limb of Sandwich dates from 1377, and its name is absent from Cinque Port records of 1432, probably because of "drastic coastal erosion, and the consequent silting up of the Wantsum Channel between Sarre and the North Mouth [adjacent to Reculver]." In 1220 King Henry III granted the archbishop of Canterbury a market to be held weekly at Reculver on Thursdays, and an annual fair was held there on Saint Giles's Day, 1 September.

An enclosed area of salt water known as the Dene was leased for the breeding of oysters and lobsters in 1867; as of 2014 there is a hatchery for oysters in saltwater ponds on the eastern side of Reculver belonging to a seafood company that is based there.

Today Reculver is dominated by static caravan parks, the first of which appeared after the Second World War. Also present are a country park, the King Ethelbert public house, which is a free house, and a nearby shop and cafe. Reculver was defined as a "key heritage area" in 2008, and there are plans for its development as a destination for green tourism. Canterbury City Council's Reculver Masterplan, adopted in 2009, envisaged the creation of 100 touring pitches in its caravan park, south-east of the Roman fort, which was then leased to the Camping and Caravanning Club. That caravan park was closed by 2015, when Canterbury City Council undertook a consultation on its incorporation into the country park.

Community facilities
Reculver Church of England Primary School is adjacent to the church at Hillborough. The school's site also hosts Beltinge Day Nursery and Reculver Breakfast and Afterschool Club. The nearest school for older children is Herne Bay High School.

Landmarks

Ruined church of St Mary

The medieval towers of the ruined church of St Mary are Reculver's "most dominant features". They were added in the late 12th century to a church founded in 669, when King Ecgberht of Kent granted land to Bassa the priest for the foundation of a monastery. The church was sited near the centre of the Roman fort, and was built "almost completely from demolished Roman structures". In 692 the monastery's abbot Berhtwald was elected archbishop of Canterbury, and King Eadberht II of Kent was buried inside the church in the 760s. The church building was considerably enlarged over time, the last additions being made in the 15th century. But it retained many prominent Anglo-Saxon features, including a triple chancel arch and a stone high cross, though this had been removed by 1784.

The church was demolished in 1809, in what has been described as "an act of vandalism for which there can be few parallels even in the blackest records of the nineteenth century". Archaeological excavations in the 19th and 20th centuries established the building sequence of the church, and areas of missing wall are marked on the ground by concrete edged with flint. The ruins are now in the care of English Heritage. The sea defences protecting them were installed by Trinity House in 1810, but are now maintained by the Environment Agency. Fragments of the stone cross, and two stone columns that had been part of the church's triple chancel arch, are on display in Canterbury Cathedral.

A byname for the towers is the "Twin Sisters", and an account of how this first arose was current about a hundred years after its supposed happening in the late 15th century, but in its usual form, for example in a 19th-century travel guide, it is mostly an invention created around "pseudo-historical detail". The Ingoldsby Legends includes a re-invention of the story in which two brothers, Robert and Richard de Birchington, are substituted for the two sisters. Clive Aslet used the byname in noting that, in Ian Fleming's James Bond novel Goldfinger, the villain Auric Goldfinger "lived at Reculver".

Country park

Reculver Country Park is a nature reserve managed by Canterbury City Council and the Kent Wildlife Trust. In winter brent geese and wading birds such as sanderlings and turnstones may be seen; during the summer months the largest colony of sand martins in Kent nests in the soft cliffs, on top of which fulmars were also reported to have begun nesting in 2013, and wading curlews may be seen at any time. The grasslands on the cliff top are among the few remaining cliff-top wildflower meadows left in Kent, and are home to butterflies and skylarks. Also present are the nationally scarce hog's fennel and two species of digger wasp, Alysson lunicornis and Ectemnius ruficornis. The coastline here forms part of the "key on-land Palaeocene site in the London Basin", and is the only location in the Woolwich Beds to contain wood. The foreshore displays a "rich invertebrate and vertebrate fossil fauna ... and the section has been extensively studied over many years." The park first won a Green Flag Award in 2005, and it is estimated that over 200,000 people visit it each year, including up to 3,500 students for educational trips. Canterbury City Council's Reculver Masterplan envisages purchasing farmland to the south of the country park to replace land lost to the sea through coastal erosion.

In 2011 it was found that the shoreline in the Herne Bay area, including Reculver, had come under threat from an invasive species, the carpet sea squirt (Didemnum vexillum), also known as "marine vomit". First recorded in UK waters in 2008, the carpet sea squirt is indigenous to the sea around Japan, but it has been carried to other parts of the world, including New Zealand and the US, on boat hulls, fishing equipment and floating seaweed. Carpet sea squirt can overgrow other, sessile species, "potentially smothering species living in gravel and affecting fisheries."

Centre for renewable energy
A visitor centre in Reculver Country Park re-opened in 2009 as the Reculver Renewable Energy and Interpretation Centre, "marking 200 years of the moving of Reculver village". The centre features a log burner fuelled by logs from the Blean woodland, solar and photovoltaic panels provide electrical power, and there are displays describing the history, geography and wildlife of the area.

Transport

From Roman times there was a connection to Canterbury by road, the presence of which is reflected in parish boundaries for much of its length. An estate map of 1685 shows the Reculver end of this road as "The King's highe Way", which may have been in use until 1875, when it was reported that a public road had been diverted because of a cliff fall near Love Street Farm. Remains of a Roman road leading to the east gate of the fort have also been found, which were "substantial ... consisting of a sandstone platform [10–13 feet (3–4 m)] wide and at least [11 inches (30 cm)] deep."

In 1839 coaches and vans ran daily from Herne Bay to Canterbury and on to destinations on the southern and eastern coasts of Kent, with access to the English Channel, at Deal, Dover, Sandgate and Hythe. In 1865 transport from Herne Bay was available by "fly" – a type of one-horse hackney carriage. Today, bus services calling at a stop adjacent to the King Ethelbert Inn connect Reculver with Herne Bay, Canterbury, Birchington and Margate.

Both stations are on the Chatham Main Line, running between London's Victoria station and Ramsgate, on the south-eastern coast of the Isle of Thanet. The railway first reached Herne Bay from the west in 1861 and was extended to Ramsgate Harbour railway station by 1863, but no provision was made for public access from Reculver, although purchase of land for a station there had been envisaged and a short-lived goods station was opened in 1864. In the same year a passenger station was proposed for Reculver, primarily to serve tourists, but it was not built. In 1884 the South Eastern Railway proposed building a branch line from its station at Grove Ferry on the Ashford to Ramsgate line to join the London, Chatham and Dover Railway's Chatham Main Line at Reculver, thereby linking Canterbury and Herne Bay. The Canterbury and Kent Coast Railway Bill was presented to a select committee of MPs in January 1885: the London, Chatham and Dover Railway objected to it, particularly the junction with their main line at Reculver, so the Bill was rejected and the line was not built. Rudimentary houses were erected by the East Kent Railway company on nearby marshland in 1858 for the navvies who constructed the line through the area; these had been taken over by enginemen of the South Eastern and Chatham Railway by October 1904, when they were replaced by cottages.

There is no provision for access to Reculver from the sea, but there were maritime connections from at least the 1st century, when the Roman fort of Regulbium had a supporting harbour. The quantity and variety of coins found at Reculver dating from the 7th century to the 8th are almost certainly related to its location on a major trade route through the Wantsum Channel; there was probably still a harbour in Anglo-Saxon times, and the monastery may well have operated a "fleet of ships and its own boatyard." Details in the 10th-century charter in which King Eadred gave Reculver to the archbishops of Canterbury suggest that there was then an island immediately to the north, creating a "mini-Wantsum [Channel that] could have provided a sheltered channel for beaching and berthing ships"; the present day Black Rock beyond the shoreline may be a remnant of this island.

In the 17th century an inlet to the north-west was described as "anciently for a harber of ships, called now The Old Pen". In the 18th century there was a place for landing passengers and goods at the village, and the former name of the King Ethelbert Inn, the "Hoy and Anchor", makes reference to hoys, a local type of merchant sailing vessel. These continued to serve the coastline of northern Kent in the mid-19th century. In 1810 a canal was proposed to run from the coast between Reculver and St Nicholas-at-Wade to Canterbury, with a harbour for sea-going vessels at the northern end, which would be accessible from Reculver by a new road beginning at the inn, but none of this was built. Passenger steamships called at Herne Bay pier on their route between London and destinations along the north coast of Kent from 1832, but this service ceased in the first half of the 20th century. A travel guide of 1865 advised that

Coastguards were stationed at Reculver from the mid-19th century until they were withdrawn in the mid-20th century, but the towers of the ruined church remain a landmark for mariners, both practically and through their use to mark the division between areas covered by Thames Maritime Rescue Coordination Centre (MRCC) and Dover MRCC.

Religion

The new church was given the same dedication to St Mary and, standing on a plot of land bought for £30, it was consecrated on 13 April 1813. A "miserable little  built in a rough and poverty-stricken style", it had a leaking roof and was already decaying by 1874, and was replaced by the present structure, begun in 1876 and consecrated on 12 June 1878.

The church begun in 1876 was designed in the Gothic Revival style by the architect Joseph Clarke, who was surveyor for the diocese of Canterbury at the time. It has seating for about 100 people, and is a "simple and relatively plain building", though it incorporates stonework from the old church at Reculver. The medieval baptismal font in the church is probably from the former chapel of All Saints, Shuart, on the Isle of Thanet, which was demolished in the 15th century. A war memorial stands at the northern edge of the churchyard, facing into the adjacent Reculver Lane, and records the names of 27 parishioners who died fighting in the First World War and the Second World War.

Notable people

King Eadberht II of Kent was buried in the church at Reculver in the 760s. His tomb was in the south porticus of the church, adjacent to the chancel: this porticus later became part of the church's south aisle. This was traditionally believed to be the tomb of King Æthelberht I of Kent, and was "of an antique form, mounted with two spires". John Langton, a chancellor under the kings Edward I and Edward II, was also a rector of Reculver, as was Simon of Faversham, a 14th-century philosopher and theologian: he was given the position but was forced to defend it to the Pope, and died in France, either on his way to the papal curia in Avignon or after his arrival, some time before 19 July 1306.

He was regarded as the "best doctor for the king's health", and there are more records of his medical practice than there are for "most physicians of his time." Brook subsequently passed to James de la Pine, sheriff of Kent in the early 1350s. His grandson sold it to an ancestor of Henry Cheyne, who was elected knight of the shire for Kent in 1563, and was created "Lord Cheyney" in 1572. He had sold all of his possessions in Kent by 1574 to "finance his extravagance", and Brook subsequently became the property of Sir Cavalliero Maycote, who was a leading courtier to Elizabeth I and James I. He had a "handsome monument [on the south wall of the chancel in the church at Reculver] representing Sir Cavalliero and Lady Maycote, with their nine children, all in alabaster figures, kneeling". Brook is now Brook Farm, where there is a remnant of Maycote's home in the form of a gateway, which is a "very rustic Elizabethan affair", all of brick, with mouldings.

Thomas Broke, alderman and MP for Calais in the mid-16th century, may have been a son of Thomas Brooke of Reculver, as well as being a "religious radical". Ralph Brooke, officer of arms as Rouge Croix Pursuivant and York Herald under Elizabeth I and James I, died in 1625 and was buried inside the church, where he was commemorated by a black marble tablet on the south wall of the chancel, showing him dressed in his herald's coat.

Robert Hunt, vicar of Reculver from 1595 to 1602, became minister of religion to the English colonial settlement at Jamestown, Virginia, sailing there in the ship Susan Constant in 1606, and celebrated probably "the first known service of holy communion in what is today the United States of America on 21 June 1607." Barnabas Knell was vicar from 1602 to 1646: during the English Civil War his son Paul Knell, born in about 1615, was chaplain to a regiment of Royalist cuirassiers, to whom he preached a sermon, "The convoy of a Christian", at the siege of Gloucester in August 1643. An estate map of 1685 shows that much of the land around Reculver then belonged to James Oxenden, who spent much of his life as an MP for Kent constituencies between 1679 and 1702.

In popular culture

Author Russell Hoban repurposes Reculver as "Reakys Over" in his 1980, post apocalyptic novel Riddley Walker.

References
Ian Fraser Blanthorn local East Kent Historian.

Footnotes

Notes

Bibliography

External links

Roman fortifications in England
Anglo-Saxon sites in England
Archaeological sites in Kent
City of Canterbury
Country parks in Kent
English Heritage sites in Kent
Villages in Kent